John Larrabee (April 21, 1850 – January 8, 1929) was an American pharmacist and politician, who served as the second mayor of Melrose, Massachusetts. He was also a member of the Massachusetts State legislature.

End notes 

1929 deaths
1850 births
Mayors of Melrose, Massachusetts
Members of the Massachusetts House of Representatives
People from Melrose, Massachusetts
Pharmacists from Massachusetts